Woo Kyu-min (born January 21, 1985) is a South Korean professional baseball pitcher for the Samsung Lions of the KBO League.

After the 2016 season, he became a free agent and transferred on December 5, 2016, under the terms of a total of 6.5 billion won, including four years of contract period, 3.7 billion won of down payment, and 700 million won of annual salary.

References

External links
Career statistics and player information from Korea Baseball Organization

Woo Kyu-min Fancafe at Daum 

LG Twins players
Samsung Lions players
KBO League pitchers
South Korean baseball players
2015 WBSC Premier12 players
Asian Games medalists in baseball
Baseball players at the 2006 Asian Games
Sportspeople from Daegu
1985 births
Living people
Asian Games bronze medalists for South Korea
Medalists at the 2006 Asian Games
2017 World Baseball Classic players
South Korean Buddhists